Christian Mercurio Bables (born December 6, 1992), is a Filipino actor. He was declared Best Leading Actor at the 5th Hanoi International Film Festival for his character "Intoy" in the movie Signal Rock. He was also given a Best Supporting Actor Award at the Gawad Urian Awards for his trans woman character "Barbs" in the movie Die Beautiful.

Personal life
Christian Mercurio Bables, better known as Christian Bables, was born on December 6, 1992 in Bacoor, Cavite. The second son of Rodrigo Bables (deceased) and Bing Mercurio-Urbano of Negros Occidental. He graduated with Communication Arts Degree at De La Salle University Dasma on 2013.

His great passion for acting, hard work, and determination bore fruit and were finally showcased in the television screens (after years of taking Master's class on Star Magic workshop from 2015 up to present) with series and movie projects including 'Die Beautiful' (2016 Indie Film) which gave him his biggest break in the acting industry as 'Barbs Cordero', and made him a 3-time Best Supporting Actor on several award-giving bodies such as MMFF, Gawad Urian, and Luna Awards.

Filmography

Film

Television

Awards, nominations and special recognition

References

1992 births
Living people
Filipino male television actors
Filipino male models
Star Magic